Whitetip shark may refer to:

 Oceanic whitetip shark, Carcharhinus longimanus.
 Whitetip reef shark, Triaenodon obesus.